Paraceltitina is a suborder  of early, primitive ceratitids (ammonoid cephalopods) from the middle and upper Permian; mostly equivalent to the Xenodiscoidea which it contains. Still used in some classifications but is otherwise disregarded.

References

 Paraceltitina Paleobiology Database  9/24/07
 Paraceltitina referenced in GONIAT Online 

 
Mollusc suborders